Right Here is the second studio album by Irish singer-songwriter Shane Filan. The album was released on 25 September 2015 by East West Records. The album reached number one in Ireland.

Background
In 2013, Filan released his debut studio album, You and Me, through Capitol Records. In June 2015, it was reported that he had signed a recording contract with Warner Music.

Singles
"Me and the Moon" was released as the album's first single on 10 August 2015. Filan has said of the song; "What I love about it is that it has a universal meaning. It's about losing someone you love, but it could be that you've lost a relationship, or someone has died, or you could be miles away from your loved ones on the other side of the world. I can really relate to it in that sense."

Track listing

Charts

References

2015 albums
Shane Filan albums
East West Records albums
Albums produced by Jon Maguire